Ematurga is a genus of moths in the family Geometridae erected by Julius Lederer in 1853.

Species
 Ematurga amitaria (Guenée, 1857)
 Ematurga atomaria (Linnaeus, 1758) – common heath

References

Boarmiini